Vlastimir "Đuza" Stojiljković (Serbian Cyrillic: Властимир Ђуза Стојиљковић; 30 June 1929 – 17 June 2015) was a Serbian actor and singer. He appeared in more than 120 films and television shows between 1957 and 2015. As a singer, he is best known for his 1958 hit "Devojko mala" ("Little Girl").

References

External links

 

1929 births
2015 deaths
People from Ražanj
Serbian male film actors
Laureates of the Ring of Dobrica